"Fantastic Day" is a song by British new wave band Haircut One Hundred, released as the third and final single from their debut album Pelican West. The song reached No. 9 on the UK Singles Chart in April 1982.

Release and critical reception
"Fantastic Day" was the first single to be issued after the release of the Pelican West album. It was succeeded by the release of a non-album track, "Nobody's Fool" in August, which also went top 10 in the UK.

Track listing
 7" single (Arista CLIP3)
 "Fantastic Day" - 3:12
 "Ski Club" - 3:35
Timings are not stated on the UK release although are specified on certain overseas releases.
Both tracks are featured on the Pelican West Plus album release.

 12" single (Arista CLIP123)
 "Fantastic Day" - 4:16
 "Ski Club of Great Britain" - 5:54
These versions were released by Arista in the US on a 12" promo disc but they are otherwise unique to this release.

Charts

References

1982 songs
1982 singles
Haircut One Hundred songs
Songs written by Nick Heyward
Song recordings produced by Bob Sargeant
Arista Records singles